Tony Tang may refer to:

 Tony Tang (actor), British actor
 Tony Tang (politician), Hong Kong-born Canadian engineer and city councillor